Tubes and primers are used to ignite the propellant in projectile weapons.

In ancient times various devices were adopted to ignite the charge.  Small guns were fired by priming powder poured down the touch hole (or vent) and ignited by glowing embers or a red-hot iron rod. Later the priming powder was ignited by a piece of slow match held in a linstock (a stick with a clamp at one end). About 1700, this was effected by means of a port-fire. This was a paper case about 16 inch (406 mm) long filled with slow-burning composition which burnt rather more than one inch (25 mm) per minute.  Later again the charge was exploded by paper tubes (sometimes called Dutch tubes) filled with powder and placed in the vent and ignited by a port-fire. Friction primers (sometimes called friction tubes) were used in the later black powder era, while in the latest patterns percussion or electric tubes are employed.

Vent sealing tubes
In most breech loading guns it is essential to stop the erosion of the metal of the vent by preventing the escape of gas through it when the gun is fired.  For this purpose the charges in such guns are ignited by "vent-sealing tubes." For muzzle loaded guns and small breech loading guns radially vented, especially those using black powder, the amount of erosion in the vent is not so serious.  The charge is fired by ordinary friction primers, which are blown away by the escape of gas through the vent.  In all guns axially vented, vent-sealing tubes, which are not blown out, must be employed to protect the gunners from injury. This 'vent sealing' name remained part of British nomenclature, rather than a clearer name of 'primer' or 'firing' tubes, as used elesewhere.

The common friction primer is a copper tube, packed with powder, having at the upper end a short branch (called a nib piece) at right angles.  This branch is filled with friction composition in which a friction bar is embedded.  When the friction bar is sharply pulled out, by means of a lanyard, the composition is ignited and sets fire to the powder in the long tube; the flash is conveyed through the vent and ignites the gun charge.  For naval purposes, to prevent the sailors from  being cut on the face or hurting their feet, tubes of quill instead of copper were used.  If friction primers are employed when cordite or other smokeless powder charges are used, the erosion of the vent is very rapid unless the escape of the gas is prevented; in this case T-headed tubes are used.  They are similar in action to the ordinary type, but are fixed to the vent by the head fitting a bayonet joint formed with the vent.  The explosion blows a small ball upwards and blocks the coned hole at the top of the tube and so prevents any rush of gas.

To provide a higher rate of fire, the last pull-lanyard friction T tubes in British service were replaced from 1907 in the converted 15pdr with a 'push' T tube, using an impact detonating compound, in a new axial vent.

The vent-sealing tube accurately fits into a chamber formed at the end of the vent, and is held in place by the gun lock or some similar means.  The force of the explosion expands the tube against the walls of its chamber, while the internal structure of the tube renders it gas-tight, preventing any escape of gas through the vent.

Electric tubes
In the English service electric tubes (in the United States called "primers") are mostly used, but percussion or friction tubes are preferred on the continent and electric tubes are seldom or never used.

There are two types of electric tube, one with long wires for joining up with the electric circuit and the other without external wires.  The first type has two insulated wires led into the interior and attached to two insulated brass cones which are connected by a wire "bridge" of platinum silver.  This bridge is surrounded by a priming composition of guncotton dust and mealed powder and the remainder of the tube is filled with powder.  When an electric current passes through, the bridge is heated to incandescence and ignites the priming composition.

In the wireless tube the lock of the gun makes the electric contact with an insulated disc in the head of the tube.  This disc is connected by an insulated wire to a brass cone, also insulated, the bridge being formed from an edge of the cone to a brass wire which is soldered to the mouth of the tube.  Priming composition surrounds the bridge and the tube 
is filled with powder.  The electric circuit passes from the gun lock to the disc, then through the bridge to the body of the tube, returning through the metal of the gun and mounting.

Percussion tubes

The percussion tube has a similarly shaped body to the wireless electric tube, but the internal construction differs; it is fitted with a striker, below which is a percussion cap on a hollow brass anvil, and the tube is filled with powder.

With quick firing guns (those using metallic cartridge cases) the case itself is fitted with the igniting medium; in England these are called primers.  For small guns the case contains a percussion primer, usually a copper cap filled with a chlorate mixture and resting against an anvil.  The striker of the gun strikes the cap and fires the mixture.  For larger guns an electric primer is used, the internal construction and action of which are precisely similar to the wireless tube already described; the exterior is screwed for the case.  For percussion firing an ordinary percussion tube is placed in an adapter screwed into the case.  In some foreign services a combined electric and percussion primer is used.

Cartridges

The first cartridges for cannon were made up of gunpowder packed in a paper bag or case.  For many years after the introduction of cannon the powder was introduced into the bore by means of a scoop-shaped ladle fixed to the end of a long stave.  The ladle was made of the same diameter as the shot, and it had a definite length so that it was filled once for the charging of small guns but for larger guns the ladle had to be filled two or even three times. The rule was to make the powder charge the same weight as that of the shot.

Cartridges made up in paper or canvas bags were afterwards used in forts at night-time or on board ship, so that the guns could be more rapidly loaded and with less risk than by using a ladle.  Before loading, a piece of the paper or canvas covering had to be cut open immediately under the vent; after the shot had been rammed home the vent was filled with powder from a priming horn, and the gun was then fired by means of a hot iron, quick match or port-fire.

The ancient breech-loading guns were not so difficult to load, as the powder chamber of the gun was removable and was charged by simply filling it up with powder and ramming a wad on top to prevent the escape of the powder.

Paper, canvas and similar materials are particularly liable to smoulder after the gun has been fired, hence the necessity of well sponging the piece.  Even with this precaution accidents often occurred owing to a cartridge being ignited by the still glowing debris of the previous round.  In order to prevent this, bags of non-smouldering material, such as flannel, serge or silk cloth are used; combustible material such as woven gun-cotton cloth has also been tried, but there are certain disadvantages attending this.

All smokeless powders are somewhat difficult to ignite in a gun, so that in order to prevent hang-fires every cartridge has a primer or igniter, of ordinary fine grain gunpowder, placed so as to intercept the flash from the tube; the outside of the bag containing this igniter is made of shalloon, to allow the flash to penetrate with ease.  The charge for heavy guns i.e. above 6 inches (150 mm), is made up in separate cartridges containing half or quarter charges, both for convenience of handling, and to allow a reduced charge to be used.

The cartridges are made of a bundle of cordite, or other smokeless powder, tightly tied with silk, placed in a silk cloth bag with the primer or igniter stitched on the unclosed end; the exterior is taped with silk cloth tape so as to form a stiff cartridge.  For some of the longer guns, the exterior of the cartridge is conveniently made in a cone shape, the coned form being produced by building up layers outside a cylindrical core.  In these large cartridges a silk cord becket runs up the centre with a loop at the top for handling.

For quick-firing guns the charge is contained in a brass case to which is fitted a primer for igniting the charge. This case is inserted into the gun, and when fired slightly expands and tightly fits the chamber of the gun, thus acting as an obturator and preventing any escape of gas from the breech.  This class of ammunition is especially useful for the smaller calibres of guns, such as 3-pounder (1.4 kg), 6-pounder (2.7 kg) and field guns, but Messrs. Krupp also employ metallic cartridge cases for the largest type of gun, probably on account of the known difficulty of ensuring trustworthy obturation by any other means practicable with sliding wedge guns.

The charges for these cases are made up in a very similar manner to those already described for breech loading.  Where necessary, distance pieces formed of papier-mâché tubes and felt wads are used to fill up the space in the case to prevent any movement of the charge. The mouth of the case is closed either by the base end of the projectile, in which case it is called "fixed ammunition" or "simultaneous loading ammunition" or by a metallic cap, when it is called "separate loading ammunition," projectile and charge being thus loaded by separate operations.

See also

Percussion cap
Internal priming

References

Sources

Ammunition